is a town located in Suntō District, Shizuoka Prefecture, Japan. ,  the town had an estimated population of 18,458 in 7516 households  and a population density of 140 persons per km2.

Geography
Oyama is located in the far northeastern corner of Shizuoka Prefecture, bordering on Yamanashi and Kanagawa Prefectures. Located in between the Tanzawa Mountains and the foothills of Mount Fuji, the town has an average altitude of 800 meters, and has a cool climate with heavy rainfall. Some 65% of the town is covered in forest.

Surrounding municipalities
Shizuoka Prefecture
Gotemba
Fujinomiya
Kanagawa Prefecture
Hakone
Yamakita
Minamiashigara
Yamanashi Prefecture
Fujiyoshida
Yamanakako

Demographics
Per Japanese census data, the population of Oyama has been in decline over the past 50 years.

Climate
The city has a climate characterized by hot and humid summers, and relatively mild winters (Köppen climate classification Cfa).  The average annual temperature in Oyama is 12.7 °C. The average annual rainfall is 1817 mm with September as the wettest month. The temperatures are highest on average in August, at around 24.3 °C, and lowest in January, at around 1.7 °C.

History
A small post town existed in this area since the Heian period, as Oyama is located at the base of the Ashigara Pass on the main route connecting the ancient provinces of Sagami with Kai and Suruga Provinces. The area was mostly tenryō territory under direct control of the Tokugawa shogunate in the Edo period. With the establishment of the modern municipalities system in the early Meiji period on April 1, 1889, the area was reorganized into the villages of Rokugo, Kannuma, Ashigara, Kitago and Subashiri within Suntō District, Shizuoka, two months after the opening of Suruga-Oyama Station on the Tōkaidō Main Line (now Gotemba Line).

The villages of Rokugo and Suganuma merged to form Oyama on August 1, 1912. Oyama annexed neighboring Ashigara on April 1, 1955, Kitago Village on August 1, 1956 and Subashiri on September 30, 1956. The Furusawa District of former Kitago transferred from Oyama to Gotemba on September 1, 1957.

Economy
Due to its proximity to the Tokyo metropolitan area, Oyama has a mixed economy of agriculture and light industry. Rice is the principal agricultural crop.

Education
Oyama has five public elementary schools and three public junior high school operated by the town government. The town has one public high school operated by the Shizuoka Prefectural Board of Education.

Transportation

Railway
 Central Japan Railway Company - Gotemba Line 
  -

Highway
  Tōmei Expressway Gotemba Interchange

Sister city relations
 - Shōō, Okayama, Japan from November 24, 1973
 - Ōe, Kyoto, Japan from May 29, 1982
 - Mission, British Columbia, Canada, from October 7, 1996

Local attractions
Fuji Speedway
 Fuji Cemetery
 Higashiguchi Hongū Fuji Sengen Jinja

Notable people from Oyama
Sachiko Sugiyama - professional volleyball player

References

External links

 
Towns in Shizuoka Prefecture